EKA started making knives in 1882, in the town of Eskilstuna, Sweden. The town of Eskilstuna, has an ancient tradition of working with iron and steel, that goes back to pre-Viking times. The first water driven forge was in existence as long ago as 1485.

EKA`s founder was Hadar Hallström who started up 'Hadar Hallströms´s Knife Factory Ltd' in 1882.  John Elmquist took over EKA in 1917, and he gave the company its current name, 'EKA knives'. The period 1900-1930, was a very hard time for knife makers in Scandinavia. Out of 40 pocket-knife makers, only EKA survived. But in the 1940s, bottle caps were introduced in Scandinavia, and sales again went down.

Torbjörn Evrell took over the company in 1946. He stopped producing many obsolete pocket knife models and introduced new models. In 2004, Thomas Ekberg, invented the 'EKA Swingblade' a hunting knife which has a unique rotating function between a gut-hook and a hunting knife.

EKA make several pocket knives with Viking inspired runes and dragons-wines and is today a supplier to the Royal Court of Sweden. The stainless steel of which the knives are made comes from Swedish Sandvik Steels.

References

External links
 

Knife manufacturing companies
Companies based in Södermanland County
Manufacturing companies of Sweden
Swedish companies established in 1882
Manufacturing companies established in 1882